Joan Margaret Munn-Rankin (29 July 1913 – 28 July 1981), known as Margaret Munn-Rankin and published as J. M. Munn-Rankin, was a British archaeologist, historian, and academic, who specialised in the ancient Near East. From 1949 until her death in 1981, she was a Fellow of Newnham College, Cambridge, and a lecturer in the Faculty of Oriental Studies, University of Cambridge. In addition to her extensive teaching, she was also a field archaeologist and was involved in a number of excavations including Nimrud and Tell Rifaat.

Selected works

References

1913 births
1981 deaths
British archaeologists
20th-century British historians
British women archaeologists
British orientalists
British women historians
Archaeologists of the Near East
Fellows of Newnham College, Cambridge
20th-century British women writers
Women orientalists
20th-century archaeologists